Mosel is an unincorporated community in the town of Mosel, Sheboygan County, Wisconsin, United States.

History
A post office called Mosel was established in 1869, and remained in operation until it was discontinued in 1903. The community was named after the Moselle river (German: Mosel) in Europe. The township was originally spelled Moselle, and the same may be true of the community.

Notes

Unincorporated communities in Sheboygan County, Wisconsin
Unincorporated communities in Wisconsin